Faisal Javed (born 20 February 1975) is a Pakistani-born cricketer who plays for the Qatar national cricket team. He was named in Qatar's squad for the 2017 ICC World Cricket League Division Five tournament in South Africa. He played in Qatar's opening fixture, against the Cayman Islands, on 3 September 2017.

He made his Twenty20 International (T20I) debut for Qatar against Saudi Arabia on 21 January 2019 in the 2019 ACC Western Region T20 tournament.

References

External links
 

1975 births
Living people
Cricketers from Lahore
Qatari cricketers
Qatar Twenty20 International cricketers
Pakistani emigrants to Qatar
Pakistani expatriates in Qatar